Gong Zhen was a fifteenth-century translator and writer famous for his association with the Chinese admiral Zheng He.

Life
Born near Nanjing in present-day Jiangsu Province during the Ming dynasty (1368–1644), Gong Zhen's dates of birth and death are not recorded but it is known that his father was a soldier. Gong Zhen was first appointed as an advisor to the Xuande Emperor (r. 1425–1435), then in 1431 he became secretary to the admiral Zheng He.

Gong Zhen accompanied Zheng He on his voyages to the Western Ocean until 1433. His role was as advisor, translator and diarist in the various countries that Zheng He's treasure fleet visited.

Gong Zhen is best known as the author of Xiyang Fanguo Zhi published in 1434.

References

Naval history of China
Chinese travel writers
Year of death unknown
Ming dynasty writers
Writers from Nanjing
Year of birth unknown
Treasure voyages
15th-century Chinese translators